Rob Roy is a bar in Seattle's Belltown neighborhood, in the U.S. state of Washington. Owned by Anu and Chris Elford, the business received a James Beard Foundation Award nomination in the Outstanding Bar category in 2023. Vinnie's Raw Bar has been described as a "sibling" establishment.

References

External links
 
 

Belltown, Seattle
Drinking establishments in Washington (state)
Restaurants in Seattle